Sophie Bosede Oluwole (nee Aloba, 12 May 1935 – 23 December 2018) was a Nigerian professor and philosopher, and was the first female doctorate degree holder in philosophy in Nigeria. She was a practitioner of Yoruba philosophy, a way of thinking which stems from the ethnic group based in Nigeria. She was vocal about the role of women in philosophy, and the disproportionate representation of African thinkers in education.

Life and work
Sophie Bosede Oluwole was born on May 12, 1935, to Timothy Aloba, in the town of Igbara-oke. Her paternal grandfather was from Benin City and ethnically Edo. She went to school in Ife, and was critical of the education system in the 1940s, saying a woman's career prospects were "not your ambition: it was your parents' ambition." In an interview with Jesusegun Alagbe, a journalist for The PUNCH Newspapers, Oluwole describes an event during school, where she was sent to a hospital to distribute food and medicine, and was scared by the desperately sick patients, saying "That day, I knew I was not going to be a nurse."

She studied History, Geography and Philosophy at the UNILAG in Lagos, and eventually settled on philosophy. Following her first degree, she was employed in UNILAG for a time as an assistant lecturer in 1972, and went on to complete her PhD at the University of Ibadan, making her the first female to hold a doctorate degree in philosophy. Oluwole taught African Philosophy for six years between 2002 and 2008 at the University of Lagos. At a time, she also served as the first female Dean of Student Affairs in the same institution.

Oluwole's teachings and works are generally attributed to the Yoruba school of philosophical thought, which was ingrained in the cultural and religious beliefs (Ifá) of the various regions of Yorubaland. According to Oluwole, this branch of philosophy predates the Western tradition, as the ancient African philosopher Orunmila predates Socrates by her estimate. These two thinkers, representing the values of the African and Western traditions, are two of Oluwole's biggest influences, and she compares the two in her book Socrates and Orunmila.

She died in the early hours of 23 December 2018, aged 83.

Bibliography 
 (1992) Witchcraft, Reincarnation and the God-Head (Issues in African Philosophy);
 (1997) Philosophy and Oral Tradition;
 (2014) Socrates and Ọ̀rúnmìlà: Two Patron Saints of Classical Philosophy;
 (2014) African Myths and Legends of Gender (with Akin Sofoluwe).

Secondary literature 

 Remembering the African Philosopher, Abosede Sophie Oluwole: A Biographical Essay, Ademola K. Fayemi, in Filosofia Theoretica, Issue Dedicated to Late Prof. Sophie Oluwole.
Sophie Olúwọlé's Major Contributions to African Philosophy, Hypatia, Published online by Cambridge University Press:  27 May 2020.

References

External links 

 Sophie Oluwole: Nigerian philosopher who put Yoruba thought on the map, obituary in The Independent.
Oluwole speaking about Socrates and Orunmila

1935 births
2018 deaths
Nigerian philosophers
University of Lagos alumni
Yoruba philosophers
University of Ibadan alumni
Yoruba women academics
Academic staff of the University of Lagos
Nigerian women academics
People from Ondo State
Iyalawos
Nigerian women philosophers
20th-century Nigerian philosophers
21st-century philosophers